Dhanekula Institute of Engineering and Technology is a private college located in Ganguru, near Vijayawada city in Andhra Pradesh. It is affiliated to JNTUK Kakinada.

History 
The Dhanekula Institute of Engineering and Technology opened in 2009. It was founded by Dhanekula Ravindranadh Tagor.

Admissions 

The admissions are governed by the rules of the AP State council for Higher Education. Students are admitted based on their results on the Engineering Agricultural and Medical Common Entrance Test to access the undergraduate program.

Organization 
The Dhanekula Institute of Engineering and Technology is a private institute affiliated with Acharya Nagarjuna University & JNTU Kakinada.

References

Engineering colleges in Andhra Pradesh
Universities and colleges in Krishna district
Educational institutions established in 2009
2009 establishments in Andhra Pradesh